Fireworks photography is the process of taking photographs of fireworks at night. It is a type of night photography, specifically using available light of the fireworks instead of artificial light. Without using the flash on the camera, the photographer often exposes the image for a period of time, known as long exposure.  Brighter fireworks sometimes support shorter exposure times.

Exposing the image for long periods of time, requires that the camera is held as steady as possible by the photographer, as slight movements will result in notable camera shake. The most common and effective equipment used to prevent camera shake for long image exposures are a good sturdy tripod along with a remote shutter release (avoiding to have to touch the camera when taking the shot).

Another challenge the photographer faces with exposure timing is having to estimate how long to expose the image in relation to when the firework bursts. Opening the shutter just before the firework bursts and then closing it after its finished would provide the ideal timing for capturing that 'perfect moment'. 
This can be achieved by setting the camera to 'b' or 'bulb' whereby exposure times are under the direct control of the photographer through the shutter release button.

Examples
The following samples are ordered from longer to shorter exposure time.

References

External links
Three Fireworks Photography articles from New York Institute of Photography

Photography by genre